Gamo Outdoor S.L.U, or simply Gamo, is a Spanish airgun manufacturer based in Barcelona, Spain, and is the largest producer of airguns in Europe and the largest producer of airgun pellets in the world.  The company was founded in 1959, as El Gamo, and airgun production first started in 1961.  Today Gamo products include air rifles, air pistols, ammunition and optics.  They produce primarily airguns intended for mass market.

When Manganese Bronze Holdings liquidated what remained of the gun division of the Birmingham Small Arms Company in 1986, assets including the logo and the right to use the initials "BSA" were purchased by Gamo who have continued the air rifle business at Armoury Road, Small Heath, Birmingham B11 2PP under the name  BSA Guns (UK) Limited.

During the 1970s in the UK El Gamo marketed two air rifles, the Marksman, a conventional .22 rifle with a fitted and pre-zeroed telescopic sight, and the Paratrooper repeater, a .177 pistol-gripped repeating rifle incorporating a tubular magazine along the top of the cylinder, and using a rising/falling breech mechanism for positioning the pellet.

References

External links 
 Gamo website

Pneumatic weapons
Hunting equipment